Suburbia refers to the suburbs of a metropolitan area.

Suburbia may also refer to:

Film and theater
 Suburbia (film), a 1984 film by Penelope Spheeris
 subUrbia (play), a 1994 play by Eric Bogosian
 subUrbia (film), a 1996 adaptation of Bogosian's play, directed by Richard Linklater

Songs
 "Suburbia" (song), by Pet Shop Boys, 1986
 "Suburbia", by Kelly Osbourne from Sleeping in the Nothing, 2005
 "Suburbia", by the Matthew Good Band from Beautiful Midnight, 1999
 "Suburbia", by Troye Sivan from Blue Neighbourhood, 2015
 "Suburbia", by the Wonder Years from Suburbia I've Given You All and Now I'm Nothing, 2011

Other uses
 Suburbia (board game), a city-building board game designed by Ted Alspach
 Suburbia (book), a 1973 photojournalism monograph by Bill Owens
 Suburbia (department store), a chain of department stores in Mexico
 Suburbia Roller Derby, a roller derby league based in Yonkers, New York, US

See also 
 Suburban (disambiguation)
 The Suburbs (disambiguation)